First Rush is the debut album by American comedian Chris Rush. The album was released in 1973 on Atlantic Records. Originally on LP and 8 track, the album was re-released as a digital download in 2009 by Comedy Spotlight.

"First Rush" is a reference to the state of euphoria one may have after the intake of an opiate. This is known commonly as a Rush.

Shorter promotional flexi discs titled, "This Is Your First Rush" were placed in the July '73 issue of National Lampoon Magazine, where Rush was an original contributing writer and editor from 1970-1973.

It was marketed as, "The Cosmic Comedy of Chris Rush" which was written on the back cover.

Track listing

Side one
 Even Nice People Get TV (Funk) (Puerto Rican Wagon Train) (Howdy Doody) – 4:32
 Ca-Ca-Ah-Ah-Doody-Poo-Poo - 1:32
 Grass (Munchie Monster) (The Dealer Man) (El Exigente) (Lawrence Talbot Turns On) (Filtered Prunes) - 9:00
 Science Fiction (U.F.O.) (Alien Meets the Wino) (Star Trek) (Getting High in the Future) - 3:49

Side two
 Jesus In A Dope Bust - 3:17
 Sister John Damian's Virgin School - 6:22
 Golden Zits Of The Fifties - 3:00
 Mind Farts - 3:32
 Naked Ape - 0:55
 Blacula Meets Tar Baby - 2:52
 Abie's Magic Hat - 1:45

Personnel
Bob Prewitt - Recording and Editing Engineer
David Kuntz - Assistant Engineer
George Laccorn - Assistant Engineer
Johanna Prewitt - Assistant Engineer
Thomas Hachtman - Art Direction
Michael Sullivan - Photograph
Paul Gorgone - Special Thanks
Linda Meyer - Special Thanks
Richard Skidmore - Special Thanks
Bob Warner - Special Thanks
Landrush Productions INC. - Management

References

1973 debut albums
Atlantic Records albums
Chris Rush albums
1970s comedy albums